Samboandi may refer to:

In Gnagna Province, Burkina Faso:

Samboandi, Coalla
Samboandi, Manni